École secondaire des Chutes is a Francophone secondary school in Rawdon, Quebec, operated by the Commission scolaire des Samares.

References

High schools in Quebec